Harry Marshall Ness (8 June 1885 – 26 June 1957) was an English footballer who played for Barnsley and Sunderland. He was a full back.

Club career

Harry Ness was part of the Barnsley side that contested the 1910 FA Cup Final. They lost in a replay 2–0 to Newcastle United. He transferred to Sunderland in 1911.

He was a FA Cup runner up again in 1913 FA Cup Final when Sunderland were beaten 1–0 by Aston Villa but he did get a league winners' medal as Sunderland topped the table.

In 1916, Ness enlisted with 42nd Battalion of the Royal Highlanders (Black Watch) and first went to Perth to train.

In May 1920, he was transferred to Aberdeen. He suffered an injury in a pre-season match but was reported to have made a complete recovery by October 1920, and played for their reserve team. Some incident occurred, as in May 1921, he filed a claim against Aberdeen with the SFA for £132. The next month, it was reported that Aberdeen came to a settlement with Ness. In August of that year, it was reported that Aberdeen would transfer Ness.

Post-career
He married Laura Hurd in 1924. He later worked as a publican in Scarborough, where he died in 1957.

References

1885 births
1957 deaths
English footballers
Barnsley F.C. players
Sunderland A.F.C. players
Aberdeen F.C. players
British Army personnel of World War I
Association football fullbacks
FA Cup Final players